Whitney Eugene Thayer (December 11, 1838, Mendon, Massachusetts – June 27, 1889, Burlington, Vermont) was an American organist and composer.

Thayer gave his first concert just after the installation of the new organ in the Boston Music Hall in 1863.  An early student of John Knowles Paine, he advanced to studied organ and counterpoint in Berlin with Carl August Haupt (who also taught Paine).  After returning from Berlin he worked in Boston and later in New York City as an organist.  He was also a touring virtuoso, organ teacher, and music writer.

Apart from a festive cantata and a mass, he composed numerous works for organ, art songs, and vocal quartets.

Notes and references

External links
 

1838 births
1889 deaths
19th-century American composers
19th-century classical composers
19th-century organists
American classical organists
American male organists
American male classical composers
People from Mendon, Massachusetts
Pupils of John Knowles Paine
American Romantic composers
Classical musicians from Massachusetts
19th-century American male musicians
Male classical organists